Arthen son of Seisyll ( or Arthgen ap Seisyll; died c. 807) was a king of Ceredigion in Wales of the Early Middle Ages. His father was Seisyll ap Clydog.

The Annals of Wales mentions his death. Phillimore's reconstruction dates the entry to 807.

References

Year of birth unknown
807 deaths
Monarchs of Ceredigion
9th-century Welsh monarchs